The badminton women's singles tournament at the 2019 European Games was held from 24 to 30 June at Falcon Club.

Competition format
The singles tournament is played with 32 participants, initially playing in eight groups of four, before the top two from each group qualifies for a 16-player knock-out stage.

Schedule
All times are in FET (UTC+03).

Seeds
Seeds for all badminton events at the 2nd European Games were announced on 29 May.
 (bronze medal)
 (gold medal)
 (silver medal)
 (bronze medal)
 (quarterfinals)
 (group stage)
 (quarterfinals)
 (quarterfinals)

Results
The group stage draws was held on 4 June.

Group stage

Group A

Group B

Group C

Group D

Group E

Group F

Group G

Group H

Knock-out stage

References

W